The Samsung Galaxy Note Pro 12.2 is a 12.2-inch Android-based tablet computer produced and marketed by Samsung Electronics. It belongs to the generation of the Samsung Galaxy Note series and Pro tablets, which also includes an 8.4-inch model, the Samsung Galaxy Tab Pro 8.4, a 10.1-inch model, the Samsung Galaxy Tab Pro 10.1, and another 12.2 inch model, the Samsung Galaxy Tab Pro 12.2. It was announced on 6 January 2014, and was released on February 13 in the US, starting at $749.

History 
The Galaxy Note Pro 12.2 was announced on 6 January 2014. It was shown along with the Galaxy Tab Pro 12.2, Tab Pro 10.1, and Tab Pro 8.4 at the 2014 Consumer Electronics Show in Las Vegas.

Features
The Galaxy Note Pro 12.2 was released with Android 4.4.2 KitKat. Samsung had customized the interface with its TouchWiz UX software. As well as apps from Google, including Google Play, Gmail and YouTube, it had access to Samsung apps such as ChatON, S Suggest, S Voice, Smart Remote (Peel) and All Share Play. Additional pen-oriented features and apps had been added to the Note Pro 12.2 namely Air Command menu which provided shortcuts to pen-oriented features such as Action Memos (on-screen sticky notes that use handwriting recognition to detect their contents and provide relevant actions such as looking up addresses on Google Maps and dialling phone numbers), Screen Write which is an annotation tool, Pen Window which allowed users to draw pop-up windows to run certain apps inside, the search tool S Finder, Scrapbook, and an updated version of S Note. Unlike its predecessor the Note 10.1 which has My Magazine, a news aggregator app that was accessible by swiping up from the bottom of the screen, this feature is missing.

The Galaxy Note Pro 12.2 was available in Wi-Fi-only (SM-P900), and 4G/LTE & Wi-Fi (SM-907A and SM-P905) variants. Storage ranged from 16 to 64 GiB depending on the model, with a microSDXC card slot for expansion. It had a 12.2-inch WQXGA TFT screen with a resolution of 2560×1600 pixels.  It also featured a 2 MP front camera and an 8 MP rear-facing camera, and could record HD videos.

See also
 Samsung Galaxy Note series
 Samsung Electronics
 Samsung Galaxy Note 10.1 2014 Edition

References

External links
 

Android (operating system) devices
Tablet computers introduced in 2014
Galaxy Note Pro 12.2
Tablet computers